The 2021 Atlanta Braves season was the 151st season of the Atlanta Braves franchise, the 56th Season in Atlanta, and the Braves' 5th season at Truist Park. The Braves were managed by Brian Snitker, in his sixth season as the team’s manager. The Braves clinched their fourth consecutive National League East division title. They defeated the Milwaukee Brewers in the Division Series and faced the Los Angeles Dodgers in the Championship Series for the second straight year. They defeated the Dodgers in six games to reach the World Series for the first time since 1999. They would go on to defeat the Houston Astros in six games, winning their first World Series since 1995, their second since moving to Atlanta, and their fourth in franchise history. Jorge Soler won the Most Valuable Player award in the World Series.

Offseason

November 
 On November 11, 2020, the Braves re-signed right-handed relief pitcher Josh Tomlin to a one-year, $1 million contract that includes a $1.25 million club option for 2022.
 On November 16, 2020, the Braves signed left-handed starting pitcher Drew Smyly to a one-year, $11 million contract.
On November 24, 2020, the Braves signed right-handed starting pitcher Charlie Morton to a one-year, $15 million contract.

February
On February 5, 2021, the Braves re-signed outfielder Marcell Ozuna to a four-year, $64 million contract. The contract includes a club option for a fifth year, worth $16 million, with a $1 million buyout.

Regular season

Standings

National League East

National League Division Leaders

Record vs. opponents

Game log

|- style="background:#fbb;"
| 1 || April 1 || @ Phillies || 2–3  || Brogdon (1–0) || Jones (0–1) || — || 8,529 || 0–1 || L1
|- style="background:#fbb;"
| 2 || April 3 || @ Phillies || 0–4 || Wheeler (1–0) || Morton (0–1) || — || 8,582 || 0–2 || L2
|- style="background:#fbb;"
| 3 || April 4 || @ Phillies || 1–2 || Alvarado (1–0) || Martin (0–1) || Neris (1) || 10,773 || 0–3 || L3
|- style="background:#bbb;"
| – || April 5 || @ Nationals || colspan=7 | Postponed (COVID-19, Makeup April 7)
|- style="background:#fbb;"
| 4 || April 6 || @ Nationals || 5–6 || Hudson (1–0) || Smith (0–1) || — || 4,801 || 0–4 || L4
|- style="background:#bfb;"
| 5 || April 7  || @ Nationals || 7–6  || Tomlin (1–0) || Fedde (0–1) || Smith (1) || N/A || 1–4 || W1
|- style="background:#bfb;"
| 6 || April 7  || @ Nationals || 2–0  || Jackson (1–0) || Rainey (0–1) || Newcomb (1) || 4,927 || 2–4 || W2
|- style="background:#bfb;"
| 7 || April 9 || Phillies || 8–1 || Morton (1–1) || Wheeler (1–1) || — || 14,342 || 3–4 || W3
|- style="background:#bfb;"
| 8 || April 10 || Phillies || 5–4 || Newcomb (1–0) || Bradley (0–1) || Smith (2) || 14,394 || 4–4 || W4
|- style="background:#fbb;"
| 9 || April 11 || Phillies || 6–7 || Alvarado (2–0) || Smith (0–2) || Neris (2) || 14,221 || 4–5 || L1
|- style="background:#fbb;"
| 10 || April 12 || Marlins || 3–5  || García (1–1) || Webb (0–1) || — || 11,830 || 4–6 || L2
|- style="background:#fbb;"
| 11 || April 13 || Marlins || 8–14 || Curtiss (1–0) || Fried (0–1) || — || 12,036 || 4–7 || L3
|- style="background:#fbb;"
| 12 || April 14 || Marlins || 5–6  || Curtiss (2–0) || Matzek (0–1) || García (2) || 12,480 || 4–8 || L4
|- style="background:#bfb;"
| 13 || April 15 || Marlins || 7–6 || Minter  (1–0) || Floro (0–1) || — || 11,739 || 5–8 || W1
|- style="background:#bfb;"
| 14 || April 16 || @ Cubs || 5–2 || Tomlin (2–0) || Davies (1–2) || Smith (3) || 10,343 || 6–8 || W2
|- style="background:#fbb;"
| 15 || April 17 || @ Cubs || 4–13 || Williams (2–1) || Ynoa (0–1) || — || 10,343 || 6–9 || L1
|- style="background:#bfb;"
| 16 || April 18 || @ Cubs || 13–4 || Wilson (1–0) || Hendricks (0–2) || — || 10,343 || 7–9 || W1
|- style="background:#fbb;"
| 17 || April 20 || @ Yankees || 1–3 || Loáisiga (2–0) || Matzek (0–2) || Chapman (2) || 10,017 || 7–10 || L1
|- style="background:#bfb;"
| 18 || April 21 || @ Yankees || 4–1 || Anderson (1–0) || Kluber (0–2) || — || 9,634 || 8–10 || W1
|- style="background:#bfb;"
| 19 || April 23 || Diamondbacks || 5–4 || Ynoa (1–1) || Weaver (1–2) || Smith (4) || 19,258 || 9–10 || W2
|- style="background:#bbb;"
| — || April 24 || Diamondbacks || colspan=7 | (Rain, makeup date: April 25)
|- style="background:#fbb;"
| 20 || April 25  || Diamondbacks || 0–5  || Gallen (1–0) || Wilson (1–1) || — || N/A || 9–11 || L1
|- style="background:#fbb;"
| 21 || April 25  || Diamondbacks || 0–7  || Bumgarner (2–2) || Smyly (0–1) || — || 20,693 || 9–12 || L2
|- style="background:#bfb;"
| 22 || April 26 || Cubs || 8–7 || Morton (2–1) || Workman (0–2) || Smith (5) || 17,956 || 10–12 || W1
|- style="background:#bfb;"
| 23 || April 27 || Cubs || 5–0 || Anderson (2–0) || Williams (2–2) || — || 17,603 || 11–12 || W2
|- style="background:#bfb;"
| 24 || April 28 || Cubs || 10–0 || Ynoa (2–1) || Hendricks (1–3) || — || 18,709 || 12–12 || W3
|- style="background:#fbb;"
| 25 || April 29 || Cubs || 3–9 || Alzolay (1–2) || Wilson (1–2) || — || 19,661 || 12–13 || L1
|- style="background:#fbb;"
| 26 || April 30 || @ Blue Jays || 5–13 || Ray (1–1) || Smyly (0–2) || — || 1,629 || 12–14 || L2
|-

|- style="background:#fbb;"
| 27 || May 1 || @ Blue Jays || 5–6  || Romano (2–1) || Jones (0–2) || — || 1,634 || 12–15 || L3
|- style="background:#fbb;"
| 28 || May 2 || @ Blue Jays || 2–7 || Borucki (3–1) || Anderson (2–1) || Dolis (3) || 1,554 || 12–16 || L4
|- style="background:#bfb;"
| 29 || May 4 || @ Nationals || 6–1 || Ynoa (3–1) || Ross (2–2) || — || 8,156 || 13–16 || W1
|- style="background:#bfb;"
| 30 || May 5 || @ Nationals || 5–3 || Fried (1–1) || Fedde (2–3) || Smith (6) || 8,400 || 14–16 || W2
|- style="background:#bfb;"
| 31 || May 6 || @ Nationals || 3–2 || Smyly (1–2) || Lester (0–1) || Smith (7) || 8,561 || 15–16 || W3
|- style="background:#fbb;"
| 32 || May 7 || Phillies || 2–12 || Eflin (2–1) || Morton (2–2) || — || 38,952 || 15–17 || L1
|- style="background:#bfb;"
| 33 || May 8 || Phillies || 8–7  || Webb (1–1) || De Los Santos (0–1) || — || 39,852 || 16–17 || W1
|- style="background:#bfb;"
| 34 || May 9 || Phillies || 6–1 || Ynoa (4–1) || Nola (3–2) || — || 28,829 || 17–17 || W2
|- style="background:#fbb;"
| 35 || May 11 || Blue Jays || 3–5 || Thornton (1–0) || Minter (1–1) || Romano (1) || 21,688 || 17–18 || L1
|- style="background:#fbb;"
| 36 || May 12 || Blue Jays || 1–4 || Ryu (3–2) || Jackson (1–1) || Cole (1) || 21,171 || 17–19 || L2
|- style="background:#fbb;"
| 37 || May 13 || Blue Jays || 4–8 || Bergen (1–0) || Smith (0–3) || — || 21,653 || 17–20 || L3
|- style="background:#bfb;"
| 38 || May 14 || @ Brewers || 6–3 || Smyly (2–2) || Houser (3–4) || — || 12,130 || 18–20 || W1
|- style="background:#bfb;"
| 39 || May 15 || @ Brewers || 5–1 || Anderson (3–1) || Anderson (2–3) || — || 16,344 || 19–20 || W2
|- style="background:#fbb;"
| 40 || May 16 || @ Brewers || 9–10 || Peralta (4–1) || Ynoa (4–2) || Hader (9) || 16,044 || 19–21 || L1
|- style="background:#fbb;"
| 41 || May 17 || Mets || 1–3 || Reid-Foley (1–0) || Fried (1–2) || Díaz (6) || 22,691 || 19–22 || L1
|- style="background:#fbb;"
| 42 || May 18 || Mets || 3–4 || Familia (2–0) || Smith (0–4) || Díaz (7) || 21,667 || 19–23 || L2
|- style="background:#bfb;"
| 43 || May 19 || Mets || 5–4 || Smith (1–4) || Barnes (1–1) || — || 22,619 || 20–23 || W1
|- style="background:#fbb;"
| 44 || May 20 || Pirates || 4–6  || Rodríguez (3–0) || Webb (1–2) || — || 21,430 || 20–24 || L1
|- style="background:#bfb;"
| 45 || May 21 || Pirates || 20–1 || Anderson (4–1) || Anderson (3–4) || — || 37,545 || 21–24 || W1
|- style="background:#bfb;"
| 46 || May 22 || Pirates || 6–1 || Wilson (2–2) || Keller (2–6) || — || 40,068 || 22–24 || W2
|- style="background:#bfb;"
| 47 || May 23 || Pirates || 7–1 || Fried (2–2) || Brubaker (3–4) || — || 39,874 || 23–24 || W3
|- style="background:#bfb;"
| 48 || May 25 || @ Red Sox || 3–1 || Morton (3–2) || Richards (4–3) || Smith (8) || 9,357 || 24–24 || W4
|- style="background:#fbb;"
| 49 || May 26 || @ Red Sox || 5–9 || Pivetta (6–0) || Smyly (2–3) || — || 9,197 || 24–25 || L1
|- style="background:#bbb;"
| — || May 28 || @ Mets || colspan=8| Postponed (Rain, Makeup: June 21)
|- style="background:#fbb;"
| 50 || May 29 || @ Mets || 2–13 || Walker (4–1) || Anderson (4–2) || — || 10,251 || 24–26 || L2
|- style="background:#bbb;"
| — || May 30 || @ Mets || colspan=8| Postponed (Rain, Makeup: July 26)
|- style="background:#bfb;"
| 51 || May 31 || Nationals || 5–3 || Morton (4–2) || Ross (2–5) || Smith (9) || 37,668 || 25–26 || W1
|-

|- style="background:#fbb;"
| 52 || June 1 || Nationals || 6–11 || Voth (2–0) || Fried (2–3) || — || 24,083 || 25–27 || L1
|- style="background:#fbb;"
| 53 || June 2 || Nationals || 3–5 || Hudson (4–1) || Minter (1–2) || Hand (9) || 32,752 || 25–28 || L2
|- style="background:#bfb;"
| 54 || June 3 || Nationals || 5–1 || Tomlin (3–0) || Corbin (3–5) || — || 25,595 || 26–28 || W1
|- style="background:#fbb;"
| 55 || June 4 || Dodgers || 5–9 || Urías (8–2) || Anderson (4–3) || — || 40,514 || 26–29 || L1
|- style="background:#bfb;"
| 56 || June 5 || Dodgers || 6–4 || Morton (5–2) || Kershaw (7–5) || Smith (10) || 41,136 || 27–29 || W1
|- style="background:#bfb;"
| 57 || June 6 || Dodgers || 4–2 || Fried (3–3) || Bauer (6–4) || Smith (11) || 39,439 || 28–29 || W2
|- style="background:#bfb;"
| 58 || June 8 || @ Phillies || 9–5 || Newcomb (2–0) || Brogdon (4–2) || — || 13,125 || 29–29 || W3
|- style="background:#fbb;"
| 59 || June 9 || @ Phillies || 1–2 || Suárez (2–0) || Smith (1–5) || — || 13,552 || 29–30 || L1
|- style="background:#fbb;"
| 60 || June 10 || @ Phillies || 3–4  || Alvarado (5–0) || Martin (0–2) || — || 14,261 || 29–31 || L2
|- style="background:#fbb;"
| 61 || June 11 || @ Marlins || 3–4 || Alcántara (4–5) || Morton (5–3) || García (11) || 6,595 || 29–32 || L3
|- style="background:#fbb;"
| 62 || June 12 || @ Marlins || 2–4 || Thompson (1–1) || Fried (3–4) || Floro (2) || 8,158 || 29–33 || L4
|- style="background:#bfb;"
| 63 || June 13 || @ Marlins || 6–4 || Smyly (3–3) || López (2–4) || Smith (12) || 8,448 || 30–33 || W1
|- style="background:#fbb;"
| 64 || June 15 || Red Sox || 8–10 || Sawamura (3–0) || Martin (0–3) || Barnes (15) || 36,638 || 30–34 || L1
|- style="background:#fbb;"
| 65 || June 16 || Red Sox || 8–10 || Ríos (1–0) || Greene (0–1) || Ottavino (4) || 39,847 || 30–35 || L2
|- style="background:#bfb;"
| 66 || June 17 || Cardinals || 4–0 || Morton (6–3) || Gant (4–5) || — || 33,412 || 31–35 || W1
|- style="background:#bfb;"
| 67 || June 18 || Cardinals || 9–1 || Fried (4–4) || Martínez (3–8) || — || 40,377 || 32–35 || W2
|- style="background:#bbb;"
| — || June 19 || Cardinals || colspan=7 | Postponed (rain, makeup June 20)
|- style="background:#fbb;"
| 68 || June 20  || Cardinals || 1–9  || Wainwright (5–5) || Wilson (2–3) || — || 33,781 || 32–36 || L1
|- style="background:#bfb;"
| 69 || June 20  || Cardinals || 1–0  || Smyly (4–3) || Kim (1–5) || Smith (13) || 36,977 || 33–36 || W1
|- style="background:#fbb;"
| 70 || June 21  || @ Mets || 2–4  || deGrom (7–2) || Muller (0–1) || Díaz (15) || N/A || 33–37 || L1
|- style="background:#bfb;"
| 71 || June 21  || @ Mets || 1–0  || Anderson (5–3) || Castro (2–2) || Smith (14) || 18,698 || 34–37 || W1
|- style="background:#bfb;"
| 72 || June 22 || @ Mets || 3–0 || Morton (7–3) || Díaz (0–1) || Smith (15) || 17,063 || 35–37 || W2
|- style="background:#fbb;"
| 73 || June 23 || @ Mets || 3–7 || Oswalt (1–0) || Wright (0–1) || Díaz (16) || 15,645 || 35–38 || L1
|- style="background:#fbb;"
| 74 || June 24 || @ Reds || 3–5 || Santillan (1–1) || Chavez (0–1) || Brach (1) || 23,941 || 35–39 || L2
|- style="background:#bfb;"
| 75 || June 25 || @ Reds || 3–2 || Smyly (5–3) || Gutiérrez (3–2) || Smith (16) || 30,231 || 36–39 || W1
|- style="background:#fbb;"
| 76 || June 26 || @ Reds || 1–4 || Castillo (3–10) || Anderson (5–4) || Garrett (5) || 34,671 || 36–40 || L1
|- style="background:#bfb;"
| 77 || June 27 || @ Reds || 4–0 || Muller (1–1) || Mahle (7–3) || — || 21,696 || 37–40 || W1
|- style="background:#fbb;"
| 78 || June 29 || Mets || 3–4 || Smith (3–1) || Minter (1–3) || Díaz (17) || 29,274 || 37–41 || L1
|- style="background:#bfb;"
| 79 || June 30 || Mets || 20–2 || Fried (5–4) || Peterson (2–6) || — || 28,405 || 38–41 || W1
|-

|- style="background:#bfb;"
| 80 || July 1 || Mets || 4–3 || Smith (2–5) || Lugo (1–1) || — || 35,777 || 39–41 || W2
|- style="background:#bfb;"
| 81 || July 2 || Marlins || 1–0 || Smyly (6–3) || López (4–5) || Smith (17) || 38,203 || 40–41 || W3
|- style="background:#fbb;"
| 82 || July 3 || Marlins || 2–3 || Alcántara (5–7) || Muller (1–2) || García (13) || 38,526 || 40–42 || L1
|- style="background:#bfb;"
| 83 || July 4 || Marlins || 8–7  || Smith (3–5) || Bass (1–4) || — || 34,485 || 41–42 || W1
|- style="background:#fbb;"
| 84 || July 5 || @ Pirates || 1–11 || De Jong (1–3) || Fried (5–5) || — || 11,600 || 41–43 || L1
|- style="background:#fbb;"
| 85 || July 6 || @ Pirates || 1–2 || Rodríguez (4–1) || Matzek (0–3) || — || 10,844 || 41–44 || L2
|- style="background:#bfb;"
| 86 || July 7 || @ Pirates || 14–3 || Smyly (7–3) || Crick (1–1) || — || 10,094 || 42–44 || W1
|- style="background:#bfb;"
| 87 || July 9 || @ Marlins || 5–0 || Morton (8–3) || Bass (1–5) || — || 7,446 || 43–44 || W2
|- style="background:#bfb;"
| 88 || July 10 || @ Marlins || 5–4 || Fried (6–5) || Rogers (7–6) || Smith (18) || 12,178 || 44–44 || W3
|- style="background:#fbb;"
| 89 || July 11 || @ Marlins || 4–7 || López (5–5) || Anderson (5–5) || — || 9,456 || 44–45 || L1
|- style="background:#bbcaff;"
| – || July 13 || colspan="10" | 91st All-Star Game: Denver, CO
|- style="background:#fbb;"
| 90 || July 16 || Rays || 6–7  || Wisler (2–3) || Chavez (0–2) || Fairbanks (4) || 40,485 || 44–46 || L2
|- style="background:#bfb;"
| 91 || July 17 || Rays || 9–0 || Fried (7–5) || Fleming (7–5) || — || 40,868 || 45–46 || W1
|- style="background:#fbb;"
| 92 || July 18 || Rays || 5–7 || Springs (5–1) || Minter (1–4) || Fairbanks (5) || 34,544 || 45–47 || L1
|- style="background:#bbb;" 
| — || July 19 || Padres || colspan=8| Postponed (Rain, Makeup: July 21)
|- style="background:#bfb;"
| 93 || July 20 || Padres || 2–1 || Toussaint (1–0) || Darvish (7–4) || Smith (19) || 36,621 || 46–47 || W1
|- style="background:#fbb;"
| 94 || July 21  || Padres || 2–3  || Paddack (6–6) || Muller (1–3) || Melancon (28) || 28,621 || 46–48 || L1
|- style="background:#bbb;" 
| — || July 21  || Padres || colspan=8| Suspended (Rain, Makeup: September 24)
|- style="background:#bfb;"
| 95 || July 22 || @ Phillies || 7–2 || Morton (9–3) || Moore (0–2) || — || 22,645 || 47–48 || W1
|- style="background:#fbb;"
| 96 || July 23 || @ Phillies || 1–5 || Wheeler (8–5) || Fried (7–6) || — || 23,546 || 47–49 || L1
|- style="background:#bfb;"
| 97 || July 24 || @ Phillies || 15–3 || Tomlin (4–0) || Velasquez (3–5) || — || 24,479 || 48–49 || W1
|- style="background:#fbb;"
| 98 || July 25 || @ Phillies || 1–2 || Nola (7–6) || Toussaint (1–1) || Suárez (4) || 19,370 || 48–50 || L1
|- style="background:#bfb;"
| 99 || July 26  || @ Mets || 2–0  || Muller (2–3) || Stroman (7–9) || Smith (20) || N/A || 49–50 || W1
|- style="background:#fbb;"
| 100 || July 26  || @ Mets || 0–1  || May (3–2) || Jackson (1–2) || Díaz (22) || 24,384 || 49–51 || L1
|- style="background:#bfb;"
| 101 || July 27 || @ Mets || 12–5 || Morton (10–3) || Eickhoff (0–2) || — || 24,000 || 50–51 || W1
|- style="background:#fbb;"
| 102 || July 28 || @ Mets || 1–2 || May (4–2) || Fried (7–7) || Díaz (23) || 25,787 || 50–52 || L1
|- style="background:#bfb;"
| 103 || July 29 || @ Mets || 6–3 || Chavez (1–2) || Walker (7–5) || Smith (21) || 26,080 || 51–52 || W1
|- style="background:#fbb;"
| 104 || July 30 || Brewers || 5–9 || Boxberger (4–2) || Toussaint (1–2) || — || 38,680 || 51–53 || L1
|- style="background:#bfb;"
| 105 || July 31 || Brewers || 8–1 || Chavez (2–2) || Woodruff (7–6) || — ||  | 39,088 || 52–53 || W1
|-

|- style="background:#fbb;" 
| 106 || August 1 || Brewers || 1–2 || Anderson (4–5) || Morton (10–4) || Hader (22) || 33,469 || 52–54 || L1
|- style="background:#bfb;" 
| 107 || August 3 || @ Cardinals || 6–1 || Fried (8–7) || Lester (3–6) || — || 31,509 || 53–54 || W1
|- style="background:#bfb;" 
| 108 || August 4 || @ Cardinals || 7–4 || Martin (1–3) || Gallegos (5–4) || Smith (22) || 32,205 || 54–54 || W2
|- style="background:#bfb;" 
| 109 || August 5 || @ Cardinals || 8–4 || Santana (1–0) || Gallegos (5–5) || — || 30,549 || 55–54 || W3
|- style="background:#bfb;" 
| 110 || August 6 || Nationals || 8–4 || Santana (2–0) || Fedde (4–8) || — || 34,454 || 56–54 || W4
|- style="background:#fbb;" 
| 111 || August 7 || Nationals || 2–3 || Machado (1–0) || Smith (3–6) || Finnegan (3) || 38,300 || 56–55 || L1
|- style="background:#bfb;" 
| 112 || August 8 || Nationals || 5–4 || Fried (9–7) || Corbin (6–11) || Martin (1) || 29,101 || 57–55 || W1
|- style="background:#bfb;"
| 113 || August 10 || Reds || 3–2 || Smyly (8–3) || Hembree (2–7) || Smith (23) || 24,432 || 58–55 || W2
|- style="background:#bfb;" 
| 114 || August 11 || Reds || 8–6  || Santana (3–0) || Sims (4–2) || — || 23,375 || 59–55 || W3
|- style="background:#fbb;" 
| 115 || August 12 || Reds || 3–12 || Gutiérrez (8–3) || Muller (2–4) || — || 23,395 || 59–56 || L1
|- style="background:#bfb;" 
| 116 || August 13 || @ Nationals || 4–2 || Morton (11–4) || Gray (0–1) || Smith (24) || 24,812 || 60–56 || W1
|- style="background:#bfb;" 
| 117 || August 14 || @ Nationals || 12–2 || Fried (10–7) || Corbin (6–12) || — || 27,959 || 61–56 || W2
|- style="background:#bfb;" 
| 118 || August 15 || @ Nationals || 6–5 || Chavez (3–2) || Espino (3–4) || Smith (25) || 27,488 || 62–56 || W3
|- style="background:#bfb;" 
| 119 || August 16 || @ Marlins || 12–2 || Toussaint (2–2) || Garrett (1–2) || — || 6,442 || 63–56 || W4
|- style="background:#bfb;" 
| 120 || August 17 || @ Marlins || 2–0 || Martin (2–3) || Alcántara (7–11) || Smith (26) || 6,079 || 64–56 || W5
|- style="background:#bfb;" 
| 121 || August 18 || @ Marlins || 11–9 || Morton (12–4) || Luzardo (4–6) || — || 6,871 || 65–56 || W6
|- style="background:#bfb;" 
| 122 || August 20 || @ Orioles || 3–0 || Fried (11–7) || Akin (0–8) || — || 13,583 || 66–56 || W7
|- style="background:#bfb;" 
| 123 || August 21 || @ Orioles || 5–4 || Smyly (9–3) || Harvey (6–13) || Smith (27) || 15,774 || 67–56 || W8
|- style="background:#bfb;"  
| 124 || August 22 || @ Orioles || 3–1 || Toussaint (3–2) || Means (5–6) || Smith (28) || 11,180 || 68–56 || W9
|- style="background:#fbb;"
| 125 || August 23 || Yankees || 1–5 || Montgomery (5–5) || Ynoa (4–3) || — || 39,176 || 68–57 || L1
|- style="background:#fbb;" 
| 126 || August 24 || Yankees || 4–5 || Holmes (5–2) || Morton (12–5) || Peralta (5) || 37,426 || 68–58 || L2
|- style="background:#bfb;" 
| 127 || August 27 || Giants || 6–5 || Minter (2–4) || Watson (5–4) || Smith (29) || 35,586 || 69–58 || W1
|- style="background:#fbb;" 
| 128 || August 28 || Giants || 0–5 || Webb (8–3) || Ynoa (4–4) || — || 39,558 || 69–59 || L1
|- style="background:#bfb;" 
| 129 || August 29 || Giants || 9–0 || Anderson (6–5) || DeSclafani (11–6) || — || 28,820 || 70–59 || W1
|- style="background:#fbb;" 
| 130 || August 30 || @ Dodgers || 3–5 || Urías (15–3) || Smyly (9–4) || Treinen (5) || 49,410 || 70–60 || L1
|- style="background:#fbb;" 
| 131 || August 31 || @ Dodgers || 2–3 || Treinen (5–5) || Matzek (0–4) || Jansen (30) || 44,952 || 70–61 || L2
|-

|- style="background:#fbb;" 
| 132 || September 1 || @ Dodgers || 3–4 || Bickford (3–1) || Martin (2–4) || Kelly (2) || 47,473 || 70–62 || L3
|- style="background:#bfb;" 
| 133 || September 2 || @ Rockies || 6–5 || Webb (2–2) || Almonte (1–3) || Smith (30) || 21,481 || 71–62 || W1
|- style="background:#fbb;" 
| 134 || September 3 || @ Rockies || 3–4 || Senzatela (4–9) || Ynoa (4–5) || Estévez (4) || 24,371 || 71–63 || L1
|- style="background:#fbb;" 
| 135 || September 4 || @ Rockies || 6–7 || Kinley (3–2) || Minter (2–5) || Estévez (5) || 35,351 || 71–64 || L2
|- style="background:#bfb;" 
| 136 || September 5 || @ Rockies || 9–2 || Morton (13–5) || Feltner (0–1) || — || 33,957 || 72–64 || W1
|- style="background:#bfb;" 
| 137 || September 7 || Nationals || 8–5 || Jackson (2–2) || Harper (0–2) || Smith (31) || 20,544 || 73–64 || W2
|- style="background:#fbb;" 
| 138 || September 8 || Nationals || 2–4 || Voth (4–1) || Rodríguez (4–3) || Finnegan (8) || 20,074 || 73–65 || L1
|- style="background:#bfb;" 
| 139 || September 9 || Nationals || 7–6  || Webb (3–2) || Suero (2–3) || — || 23,657 || 74–65 || W1
|- style="background:#bfb;" 
| 140 || September 10 || Marlins || 6–2 || Anderson (7–5) || Rogers (7–7) || — || 33,850 || 75–65 || W2
|- style="background:#fbb;" 
| 141 || September 11 || Marlins || 4–6 || Bass (3–7) || Rodríguez (4–4) || Floro (10) || 35,250 || 75–66 || L1
|- style="background:#bfb;" 
| 142 || September 12 || Marlins || 5–3 || Webb (4–2) || Bass (3–8) || Smith (32) || 27,847 || 76–66 || W1
|- style="background:#fbb;" 
| 143 || September 14 || Rockies || 4–5 || Gray (8–10) || Toussaint (3–3) || Estévez (8) || 22,579 || 76–67 || L1
|- style="background:#fbb;" 
| 144 || September 15 || Rockies || 2–3  || Estévez (3–4) || Minter (2–6) || Stephenson (1) || 21,382 || 76–68 || L2
|- style="background:#bbb;" 
| — || September 16 || Rockies || colspan=7 | Cancelled (Rain)
|- style="background:#fbb;" 
| 145 || September 17 || @ Giants || 5–6  || Doval (4–1) || Webb (4–3) || — || 26,644 || 76–69 || L3
|- style="background:#fbb;" 
| 146 || September 18 || @ Giants || 0–2 || Littell (4–0) || Morton (13–6) || Leone (2) || 31,058 || 76–70 || L4
|- style="background:#bfb;" 
| 147 || September 19 || @ Giants || 3–0 || Fried (12–7) || DeSclafani (12–7) || Smith (33) || 32,210 || 77–70 || W1
|- style="background:#bfb;" 
| 148 || September 20 || @ Diamondbacks || 11–4 || Webb (5–3) || Mejía (0–2) || — || 9,642 || 78–70 || W2
|- style="background:#bfb;" 
| 149 || September 21 || @ Diamondbacks || 6–1 || Smyly (10–4) || Weaver (3–6) || — || 8,879 || 79–70 || W3
|- style="background:#bfb;" 
| 150 || September 22 || @ Diamondbacks || 9–2 || Anderson (8–5) || Kelly (7–11) || — || 10,631 || 80–70 || W4
|- style="background:#fbb;" 
| 151 || September 23 || @ Diamondbacks || 4–6 || Poppen (1–0) || Webb (5–4) || Wendelken (2) || 6,880 || 80–71 || L1
|- style="background:#fbb;" 
| 152 || September 24  || Padres || 5–6  || Hudson (5–1) || Smith (3–6) || Melancon (29) || N/A || 80–72 || L2
|- style="background:#bfb;" 
| 153 || September 24  || @ Padres || 4–0 || Fried (13–7) || Knehr (1–1) || — || 33,265 || 81–72 || W1
|- style="background:#bfb;" 
| 154 || September 25 || @ Padres || 10–8  || Rodríguez (5–4) || Hudson (5–3) || Smith (34) || 39,026 || 82–72 || W2
|- style="background:#bfb;" 
| 155 || September 26 || @ Padres || 4–3 || Minter (3–6) || Johnson (3–4) || Smith (35) || 41,294 || 83–72 || W3
|- style="background:#bfb;" 
| 156 || September 28 || Phillies || 2–1 || Morton (14–6) || Wheeler (14–10) || Smith (36) || 29,238 || 84–72 || W4
|- style="background:#bfb;" 
| 157 || September 29 || Phillies || 7–2 || Fried (14–7) || Nola (9–9) || — || 27,664 || 85–72 || W5
|- style="background:#bfb;" 
| 158 || September 30 || Phillies || 5–3 || Anderson (9–5) || Gibson (10–9) || Smith (37) || 38,235 || 86–72 || W6
|-

|- style="background:#fbb;" 
| 159 || October 1 || Mets || 3–4 || Megill (4–6) || Ynoa (4–6) || Díaz (32) || 32,659 || 86–73 || L1
|- style="background:#bfb;" 
| 160 || October 2 || Mets || 6–5 || Smyly (11–4) || Carrasco (1–5) || Webb (1) || 37,616 || 87–73 || W1
|- style="background:#bfb;" 
| 161 || October 3 || Mets || 5–0 || Strider (1–0) || Syndergaard (0–1) || — || 33,202 || 88–73 || W2
|-

|-
| Legend:       = Win       = Loss       = PostponementBold = Braves team memberMarcell Ozuna incident
On May 28, Marcell Ozuna was arrested and charged with aggravated assault by strangulation and battery after police allegedly witnessed him grabbing his wife by the neck and throwing her against a wall. When the arrest occurred, Ozuna was on the 10day injured list recovering from an injury sustained on his left hand.

Postseason

Game log

|- style="background:#fbb;" 
| 1 || October 8 || @ Brewers || 1–2 || Houser (1–0) || Morton (0–1) || Hader (1) || 40,852 || 0–1 || L1
|- style="background:#bfb;" 
| 2 || October 9 || @ Brewers || 3–0 || Fried (1–0) || Woodruff (0–1) || Smith (1) || 43,812 || 1–1 || W1
|- style="background:#bfb;" 
| 3 || October 11 || Brewers || 3–0 || Anderson (1–0) || Houser (1–1) || Smith (2) || 41,479 || 2–1 || W2
|- style="background:#bfb;" 
| 4 || October 12 || Brewers || 5–4 || Matzek (1–0) || Hader (0–1) || Smith (3) || 40,195 || 3–1 || W3
|-

|- style="background:#bfb;" 
| 1 || October 16 || Dodgers || 3–2 || Smith (1–0) || Treinen (0–1) || — || 41,815 || 1–0 || W1
|- style="background:#bfb;" 
| 2 || October 17 || Dodgers || 5–4 || Smith (2–0) || Graterol (0–1) || — || 41,873 || 2–0 || W2
|- style="background:#fbb;" 
| 3 || October 19 || @ Dodgers || 5–6 || Gonsolin (1–0) || Jackson (0–1) || Jansen (1) || 51,307 || 2–1 || L1
|- style="background:#bfb;" 
| 4 || October 20 || @ Dodgers || 9–2 || Smyly (1–0) || Urías (0–1) || — || 53,025 || 3–1 || W1
|- style="background:#fbb;" 
| 5 || October 21 || @ Dodgers || 2–11 || Phillips (1–0) || Fried (0–1) || — || 51,363 || 3–2 || L1
|- style="background:#bfb;" 
| 6 || October 23 || Dodgers || 4–2 || Minter (1–0) || Buehler (0–1) || Smith (1) || 43,060 || 4–2 || W1
|-

|- style="background:#bfb;"
| 1 || October 26 || @ Astros || 6–2 || Minter (1–0) || Valdez (0–1) || — || 42,285 || 1–0 || W1
|- style="background:#fbb;" 
| 2 || October 27 || @ Astros || 2–7 || Urquidy (1–0) || Fried (0–1) || — || 42,833 || 1–1 || L1
|- style="background:#bfb;" 
| 3 || October 29 || Astros || 2–0 || Anderson (1–0) || García (0–1) || Smith (1) || 42,898 || 2–1 || W1
|- style="background:#bfb;" 
| 4 || October 30 || Astros || 3–2 || Matzek (1–0) || Javier (0–1) || Smith (2) || 43,125 || 3–1 || W2
|- style="background:#fbb;" 
| 5 || October 31 || Astros || 5–9 || Urquidy (2–0) || Minter (1–1) || — || 43,122 || 3–2 || L1
|- style="background:#bfb;" 
| 6 || November 2 || @ Astros || 7–0 || Fried (1–1) || García (0–2) || — || 42,868 || 4–2 || W1
|-

Postseason rosters

| style="text-align:left" |
Pitchers: 18 Drew Smyly 19 Huascar Ynoa 33 A. J. Minter 36 Ian Anderson 50 Charlie Morton 51 Will Smith 54 Max Fried 60 Jesse Chavez 68 Tyler Matzek 71 Jacob Webb 74 Dylan Lee 77 Luke Jackson 
Catchers: 16 Travis d'Arnaud 24 William Contreras
Infielders: 1 Ozzie Albies 5 Freddie Freeman 7 Dansby Swanson 9 Orlando Arcia 27 Austin Riley
Outfielders: 8 Eddie Rosario 11 Terrance Gore 12 Jorge Soler  14 Adam Duvall 22 Joc Pederson 23 Ehire Adrianza 25 Cristian Pache  38 Guillermo Heredia 
|- valign="top"

| style="text-align:left" |
Pitchers: 18 Drew Smyly 19 Huascar Ynoa  33 A. J. Minter 36 Ian Anderson 50 Charlie Morton 51 Will Smith 54 Max Fried 55 Chris Martin 60 Jesse Chavez 68 Tyler Matzek 71 Jacob Webb 74 Dylan Lee  77 Luke Jackson 
Catchers: 16 Travis d'Arnaud 24 William Contreras
Infielders: 1 Ozzie Albies 5 Freddie Freeman 7 Dansby Swanson 9 Orlando Arcia 17 Johan Camargo 23 Ehire Adrianza 27 Austin Riley
Outfielders: 8 Eddie Rosario 12 Jorge Soler  14 Adam Duvall 22 Joc Pederson 25 Cristian Pache  38 Guillermo Heredia
|- valign="top"

| style="text-align:left" |
Pitchers: 18 Drew Smyly 30 Kyle Wright 33 A. J. Minter 36 Ian Anderson 50 Charlie Morton  51 Will Smith 54 Max Fried 55 Chris Martin 60 Jesse Chavez 64 Tucker Davidson  68 Tyler Matzek 74 Dylan Lee 77 Luke Jackson 
Catchers: 16 Travis d'Arnaud 24 William Contreras
Infielders: 1 Ozzie Albies 5 Freddie Freeman 7 Dansby Swanson 9 Orlando Arcia 17 Johan Camargo  23 Ehire Adrianza  27 Austin Riley
Outfielders: 8 Eddie Rosario 11 Terrance Gore 12 Jorge Soler 14 Adam Duvall 22 Joc Pederson 38 Guillermo Heredia 
|- valign="top"

Roster

Farm system

References

External links
2021 Atlanta Braves season at Baseball Reference''

Atlanta Braves seasons
Atlanta Braves
Atlanta Braves
World Series champion seasons
National League champion seasons
National League East champion seasons